Don't Cry My Love is a family South Korean family drama series broadcast by MBC in 2008–2009 starring Lee Yu-ri, Lee Jung-jin, Oh Seung-hyun and Lee Sang-yoon. The daily drama aired on MBC on Mondays to Fridays at 20:15 from November 17, 2008 to May 22, 2009 for 132 episodes.

Cast
Jo family
Lee Yu-ri as Jo Mi-soo
Kim Chang-sook as Moon Soo-ja (Mi-soo's mother)
Kim Young-jae as Jo Tae-sub (Mi-soo's older brother)
Kim Hyun-jung as Kim Hyun-joo (Tae-sub's wife)
Lee Ah-hyun as Jo Mi-sun (Mi-soo's older sister)
Kim Mi-sook as Moon Shin-ja (Mi-soo's aunt)
Kang Boo-ja as Im Young-soon (Mi-soo's grandmother)
Park Yoo-sun as Yoon-mi (Mi-sun's 7-year-old daughter)
Kim Hwan-hee as Yoon-ji (Mi-sun's 5-year-old daughter)

Han family
Lee Jung-jin as Han Young-min
Lee Soon-jae as Han Kyu-il (Young-min's grandfather)
Kim Mi-kyung as Han Young-ok (Young-min's aunt)
Maeng Sang-hoon as Bae Dae-sung (Young-min's uncle in-law)
Kim Jin-seong as Han Joon (Young-min's 6-year-old son)

Min family
Oh Seung-hyun as Min Seo-young
Park Young-ji as (Seo-young's father)

Jang family
Lee Sang-yoon as Jang Hyun-woo
Lee Mi-young as Lee Young-sun (Hyun-woo's mother)
Choi Sang-hoon as (Hyun-woo's father)

Extended cast
Jang Young-nam as Oh Jung (Young-min's colleague)
Lee Shi-hwan as Park Hee-jun (Seo-young's friend)
Kim Yoo-mi as Jae-hee (Joon's mother / Young-min's ex-girlfriend) (cameo)
Marco as Pablo (Nepalese laborer)
Ryu Si-hyun as Yoo In-young (Young-min's college friend)

References

External links
 
 

MBC TV television dramas
2008 South Korean television series debuts
2009 South Korean television series endings
Korean-language television shows
South Korean romance television series
Television series by Pan Entertainment